Hagfors is a locality and the seat of Hagfors Municipality, Värmland County, Sweden with 10,125 inhabitants in 2010.

Its history is traced to 1873, when it was decided to build two blast furnaces at the location.

The town of Hagfors used to play host to the Swedish Rally, a car rally, every February, which provided a significant annual economic windfall for the region.

Hagfors was one of the last places in Sweden to receive the formal title of a city, when it was detached from Norra Råda in 1950. The designated coat of arms was a tribute to the furnaces. At that time the town had 6,501 inhabitants. Today it is the seat of the much larger Hagfors Municipality, but is not an administrative entity of its own.

Climate
The Hagfors area has a subarctic climate due to the area's cool nights. The official weather station is located in Gustavsfors, a rural locality  to the north at a similar altitude. Cold extremes are frequent for such a southerly area, with an all-time low of  being unique for a Swedish area just north of 60 degrees latitude. It being a subarctic climate is a result of the low September night temperatures. Given that Gustavsfors is located somewhat north and Hagfors being a little bit more urban, it is quite possible that the locality just reaches the continental threshold that would require  September mean temperatures. In terms of the official reference period of 1961-1990 however, the area is firmly subarctic.

Transportation
Hagors airport is located at the town's border. There are flights with Amapola Flyg to Stockholm Arlanda and Torsby airports.

Notable people 
 

Stefan Erkgärds (born 1985), professional ice hockey player

Monica Zetterlund (born 1937), renowned jazz vocalist

References 

Populated places in Värmland County
Populated places in Hagfors Municipality
Municipal seats of Värmland County
Swedish municipal seats